Krzysztof Ireneusz Warzycha (born 17 November 1964) is a Greek-Polish former professional footballer who played as a forward for Ruch Chorzów and for Greek club Panathinaikos. At international level, he represented the Poland national team, scoring nine goals in 50 appearances. He is widely considered as the best Panathinaikos player of all time.

Club career

Ruch Chorzów
Warzycha played for Polish team Ruch Chorzów, won the Polish Championship in 1989 and was the top scorer in the Polish premier league the same year.

Panathinaikos
Warzycha joined Panathinaikos in December 1989, and won five Greek championships (1990, 1991, 1995, 1996, 2004), five Greek cups (1991, 1993, 1994, 1995, 2004), two Greek super cups 1993, 1994, while he was the highest scorer of the Greek championship 3 times (1994, 1995, 1998).

He is Panathinaikos' all-time leading goalscorer and an idol for the club. Warzycha is considered by many to be one of the best foreign players who have played in Greece. He was one of two Poles in the title-winning side of 1995, with fellow countryman Józef Wandzik keeping over a dozen clean sheets (shutouts) during the season.

He was the top scorer of Panathinaikos with 319 goals in all competitions.

The most iconic goal
On 3 April 1996, Warzycha scored probably the most important goal of his career (according to a late interview), against Ajax Amsterdam in 1995–96 UEFA Champions League Semi-Finals in Amsterdam Olympic Stadium  and gave Ajax their first home defeat in four years, in their last home match before the demolition of the stadium.

First goal scorer
At the end of the 2000–01 season, Warzycha had scored an incredible 235 goals in 352 matches and had been the Greek Alpha Ethniki premier league's top scorer in three different years in the 90s (1994, 1995 and 1998 seasons). His appearances in the UEFA Champions League have been no less impressive – he scored six goals in Panathinaikos' nine games on the way to the semi-finals of the 1995–96 competition.

With eight goals scored in all UEFA Champions League games, Warzycha remained the best scorer of Polish nationality in this competition until the 2012–13 season, when Robert Lewandowski scored 10 times for Dortmund in Dortmund's surprise run to the Champions League final.

On 29 April 2001, during the match with Ionikos FC, Warzycha scored the 233rd goal of his career in Greece, climbing to second place on the list of all-time goal scorers, tied with Mimis Papaioannou. Warzycha later scored his 234th goal and become sole occupant of this spot.

He was granted Greek citizenship in 1998. He retired in 2004.

Managerial career
After Panathinaikos head coach Henk Ten Cate was let go on 8 December 2009, Warzycha was appointed as assistant coach alongside Nikos Nioplias.

On 1 March 2012, Warzycha was appointed as the head coach of Delta Ethniki side Egaleo, with this being his first venture into management.

In 2012, Warzycha was the head coach of Fokikos F.C.

In April 2017 he replaced Waldemar Fornalik on Ruch Chorzów manager position.

International career
Warzycha played 50 times for Poland, scoring nine goals. He played his last game for the Polish national team in April 1997 against Italy in Napoli, in a 3–0 loss.

Later life
Warzycha ran in the Greek local elections, 2014 with a New Democracy backed combination for the municipality of Athens. He was also an ANEL candidate to parliament in January 2015 legislative elections, but without success.

Career statistics

Club

International goals
Scores and results list Poland's goal tally first, score column indicates score after each Warzycha goal.

Honours
Ruch Chorzów
Ekstraklasa: 1988–89

Panathinaikos
Superleague: 1989–90, 1990–91, 1994–95, 1995–96, 2003–04
Greek Cup: 1990–91, 1992–93, 1993–94, 1994–95, 2003–04

Individual
Ekstraklasa top goalscorer: 1988–89 (24 goals)
Marlboro Cup topscorer: 1989 Chicago (4 goals) 
 Super League top goalscorer: 1993–94 (24 goals), 1994–95 (29 goals), 1997–98 (32 goals),

References

External links
 
 

Polish footballers
Panathinaikos F.C. players
1964 births
Sportspeople from Katowice
Living people
Ruch Chorzów players
Poland international footballers
Polish expatriate footballers
Expatriate footballers in Greece
Ekstraklasa players
Super League Greece players
Polish emigrants to Greece
Naturalized citizens of Greece
Panathinaikos F.C. non-playing staff
Association football forwards
Polish football managers
Polish expatriate football managers
Greek football managers
Greek expatriate football managers
Egaleo F.C. managers
Ruch Chorzów managers
Greek beach soccer players